Crofton Wood or Crofton Woods is a Site of Special Scientific Interest and Site of Metropolitan Importance for Nature Conservation in Crofton in the London Borough of Bromley. Kyd Brook goes through the Wood.

It is a large area of ancient woodland on London Clay, which supports many types of trees, shrubs and herbs. Trees in the ancient wood are mainly oak and hazel, with a central area of former fields. It has high botanical diversity, including fourteen species of sedge, and a rich invertebrate fauna.

The London Loop goes through the Wood, and there is access from a range of different points round the woodland.

See also

 List of Sites of Special Scientific Interest in Greater London

References

Parks and open spaces in the London Borough of Bromley
Nature reserves in the London Borough of Bromley
Sites of Special Scientific Interest in London
Orpington